Harry Bache Smith (December 28, 1860 – January 1, 1936) was a writer, lyricist and composer. The most prolific of all American stage writers, he is said to have written over 300 librettos and more than 6000 lyrics. Some of his best-known works were librettos for the composers Victor Herbert and Reginald De Koven.  He also wrote the book or lyrics for several versions of the Ziegfeld Follies.  

Smith was born in Buffalo, New York to Josiah Bailey Smith (born 1837) and Elizabeth Bach (born 1838). According to his autobiography First Nights and First Editions (Boston: Little, Brown, 1931), Smith's actual name at birth was Henry Bach Smith.  He married twice. His first wife was Lena Reed (born August 21, 1868), whom he married on October 12, 1887 in Chicago, Illinois. They had a son named Sydney Reed Smith (born July 15, 1892). Smith's second wife was the actress Irene Bentley (c. 1870 – June 3, 1940). They married on November 23, 1906 in Boston, Massachusetts, after she had been divorced on June 12, 1906 by her first husband James Thomas Sothoron, Jr. (1867–1913). Bentley retired from the stage in 1910 and died at Allenhurst, New Jersey. She is buried in Woodlawn Cemetery in the Bronx, NY. While on a brief holiday in Atlantic City, New Jersey, on New Year's Day in 1936, Smith died of a heart attack in his room at the Marlborough-Blenheim Hotel.

Smith worked on many of the famous musical theatre productions of his time. His younger brother Robert Bache Smith (June 4, 1875 – November 6, 1951) was also a successful lyricist.

Harry Smith's archive is largely held at the Harry Ransom Center at the University of Texas at Austin.

Selected productions
Unless otherwise specified below, Smith wrote the libretto (book and lyrics) for the work, and the date given is the date of the original production.  In addition to the below, in 1980, some of Smith's songs were featured in the Broadway revue Tintypes.

References

Further reading
 Franceschina, John. Harry B. Smith: Dean of American Librettists, Routledge (2003). ISBN 9780415938624

External links
 Harry B. Smith Papers at the Harry Ransom Center
 
 

 Harry B. Smith recordings at the Discography of American Historical Recordings.

1860 births
1936 deaths
Musicians from Buffalo, New York
Broadway composers and lyricists